Harzia is a genus of seed-borne fungus that occurs in the soil. It has been categorized in the Ceratostomataceae family.  The genus Harzia contains three accepted species: H. acremonioides, H. verrucose Hol-Jech, and H. velatea Hol-Jech. Within the genus Harzia, H. acremonioides is one of the most common species that can be found in all climate regions around the world.

The genus name of Harzia is in honour of Carl Otto Harz (1842-1906),who was a German mycologist, pharmacist and botanist.

The genus was circumscribed by Julien Noël Costantin in Muced. Simples on page 42 in 1888.

Growth and morphology
The genus Harzia consists of a hyaline mycelium, a brown thick-walled blastoconidia, and hyaline conidiophores.

References
 

Melanosporales
Taxa described in 1888
Sordariomycetes genera